Seco Mines is an unincorporated community and census-designated place in Maverick County, Texas, United States. Its population was 560 as of the 2010 census. U.S. Route 277 passes through the community.

Geography

References

Census-designated places in Maverick County, Texas
Census-designated places in Texas